Carol Morgan is an Irish ultrarunner, who specialises in non-stop mountain ultramarathons 100 km and longer, often in challenging conditions with significant ascents / descents. Born in Dublin in 1973, where she trained as a nurse, she is an advanced practitioner in emergency medicine. Morgan holds the course record for endurance ultra event, the Kerry Way Ultra.

Early running years
Morgan started running in her thirties. and has been running with Nidd Valley Running Club  in Harrogate, Yorkshire, with whom she still regularly competes, since at least 2010, gradually adding longer and longer distances to her repertoire.

Competing in road races
2007–2012 saw Morgan compete in the Connemarathon road race in Ireland in April. In 2007 she placed tenth in the marathon while incorrectly listed as from the United Kingdom. From 2009–2012 she placed either first or second in the Connemarathon ultramarathon   in conditions that varied from unseasonally hot sunshine  to pelting rain.  2010 was particularly difficult with less than 5 minutes separated first and second place with both athletes experiencing the last 2 mile incline, known as the 'hell of the west' because it affords competitors a clear view of the finish long before you reach it, together.

Since 2012 Morgan has limited participation in long distance road running saying she prefers the beauty of the mountains  and bogs.  She has chosen increasingly technical mountain events that require navigational knowledge and mandatory safety kits, and courses that include significant ascents / descents.

Competing in the mountains
In 2015 Morgan raced in France's CCC. In 2016 she placed 20th Ultra-Trail du Mont-Blanc in warm weather conditions on a course which requires participants to demonstrate technical skills by accumulating points from a list of qualifying races.  She was 11th in Spain's Transgrancanaria  the same year.

2017 brought the biannual Welsh Dragon's Back race which features a chasing start on the fifth and final day, and saw Morgan facing into the day with 15 minutes between the top three. Despite finishing well off the pace in 2015, she prevailed in 2017.

In 2018 Morgan won the Glendalough Clover Ultra  which weaves its way around the Wicklow Way despite successfully defending her 2018 Spine Race title just a few weeks previously. Glendalough Clover Ultra was a qualifying event for the Irish trail team in 2018 and Morgan was selected to represent Ireland in the 2018 IAU Trail World Championships.

Records
In 2017 Morgan reduced the women's record for Britain's  Spine Race by 43 hours to 109 hours 54 minutes. Conditions in 2017 were relatively mild and boggy, and she finished 44 hours ahead of the second woman.

In 2018 she successfully defended her Spine Race title winning by a margin of 10 hours in conditions so severe the non-stop race was paused for 12 hours (but not the race clock) due to heavy winds and snow. Amongst the other challenges of winter in the Cheviots the 2018 runners had to content with frozen water bottles. While conditions varied for competitors over the course of the 4+ days in addition to eating snow, Morgan has to contend with "50 mph winds with a chill factor of minus 16°C, snow drifts up to [her] belly button". Her record in the Spine Race was beaten in 2019 by Jasmin Paris who surpassed Morgan's record by 26 hours 41 minutes.

At home in Ireland she created a new record in the non-stop Kerry Way Ultra in 2017, covering the 200 km in 27 Hours and 58 minutes ranking fourth overall. The race, which covers the Kerry Way, took place during a code orange weather warning (heavy rainfall) and was awarded four points by the Ultra-Trail du Mont-Blanc (UTMB) as a qualifying race.

In August 2020, Morgan set a new women's Lake District 24-hour record. Starting and finishing in Braithwaite, she covering sixty-five peaks in a time of 23:57.

Achievements

References

Female ultramarathon runners
Irish ultramarathon runners
Irish female long-distance runners
Living people
1973 births
Sportspeople from Dublin (city)
Fell runners
Irish mountain runners